The Northern Hills Conference, was an athletic conference of nineteen private and public high schools located in Essex, Morris and Passaic counties in Northern New Jersey. 

There were nineteen member Northern Hills Conference schools, split into two divisions: Skyline and Suburban. The uneven number resulted from Passaic County Technical Institute's joining the conference; the school, long a member of the Bergen-Passaic Scholastic League, left that conference to join the Northern Hills after years of being the only Group IV school in a conference made up largely of Group I and Group II schools.

The conference was split up as a result of the realignment of conferences by the New Jersey State Interscholastic Athletic Association. The Passaic County schools joined the Big North Conference with members of the North Bergen Interscholastic Athletic League and the former Northern New Jersey Interscholastic League schools that were in Passaic and Bergen County. The Essex County schools joined with the schools in the Iron Hills, Colonial Hills, NNJIL, and Watchung Conferences from the same county to form the Super Essex Conference. The Morris County schools joined with members of the Iron Hills Conference and the Sussex County Interscholastic League to form the Northwest Jersey Athletic Conference.

Skyline Division

Suburban Division

External links
Northern Hills Conference Website

Essex County, New Jersey
Morris County, New Jersey
New Jersey high school athletic conferences
Passaic County, New Jersey